Farm Builders is a social enterprise in Liberia with the mission of building great farms which create prosperity for smallholder farmers now and in future generations.  Farm Builders is headquartered in Kakata District in the Republic of Liberia.  Farm Builders has received prestigious awards for social innovation from the Echoing Green and the Mulago Foundation.  Willian Lyons Morris, Sergio Pancorbo, Mima Nedelcovych, Nelson Hill, Morris Neasain, Brian Caouette, and Isaac Smith are amongst the core Farm Builders start up team.

Services offered

Farmbuilders helps farmers in Liberia by rejuvenating old rubber farms destroyed or damaged during Liberia's civil conflict.

Farmbuilders provides management and financing for farm owners to rebuild their plantations and at the same time encourages the development of food and cash crops on the same plot of land.  This will ensure food security and income before new farms begin producing.

Farmbuilders works in partnership with Buchanan Renewables, a clean biomass energy company, which uses the wood from redundant rubber trees for power generation.  This provides farmers a kick start to rebuild their futures.

Five-year plan

In its five-year business plan, Farmbuilders will rebuild 30,000 acres on smallholder farms.  This will create more than 9,000 direct jobs in a country with high unemployment; and will add many millions of dollars to the country's exports, thereby reinforcing Liberia's stability.

Slaughter-tapped

Farmbuilders' typical starting point is a visit to a farm overgrown with trees destroyed from being "slaughter-tapped" by rebels, a practice which destroyed the trees in pursuit of short-term income.
 
Farmbuilders clears the old trees using mechanized equipment, and then presents options for supporting rejuvenation of the farm.  Advice is given on crop selection, improved planting material, fertilizer, farm implements, and technical training.

Rubber growing

In partnership with a native Liberian rubber producer, Morris Rubber, and historically strong vocational training enter.  Booker Washington Institute (BWI), Farmbuilders is positioning to train farmers both to grow rubber, and to become "agropreneurs" capable of creating successful farm businesses.

Farm School

At Farmbuilders' Farm School, to launch January 2012, farm management will be taught in classrooms provided through BWI while practical skills are acquired at Farmbuilders' Model Farm, a plot of 1,000 acres .  Here rubber along with other tree species-cocoa and oil palm- will be "inter-cropped" with other short term crops, thereby maximizing the income and employment, creating potential of our intervention.

Agroforestry

Farmbuilders is helping smallholders access new markets, including those for export.  They believe that Liberia can be competitive in exports via our agroforestry model, in which land and clearing costs are low because they are.shared between multiple crops.   These low costs complement Liberia's other competitive advantages, which include climate, proximity to markets, and an abundance of skilled labor.

In this effort, Farmbuilders seeks partnerships with customers seeking new markets, helping to leverage their investment for social good in providing opportunities for smallholders.

References

External links
 
 Farmthailand

Social enterprises
Organizations based in Liberia